is a 2019 stop-motion animation series created by Dwarf Studio in cooperation with San-X that premiered on Netflix on April 19, 2019. In October 2020, it was announced another stop-motion series Rilakkuma's Theme Park Adventure would be released on Netflix. It has the same production staff as the previous series. Rilakkuma's Theme Park Adventure was released worldwide exclusively on Netflix on August 25, 2022.

Characters

A soft, toy-like brown bear whose interests are mostly limited to sleeping and eating. He appeared in front of Kaoru's apartment one day and started living with her afterwards.

A small, toy-like white bear and Rilakkuma's close friend. She also appeared at Kaoru's front door one day and began living with her too.

Kaoru's pet yellow chick. Rather than sleeping and eating like Rilakkuma, Kiiroitori has a hard-working nature and loves cleaning.

An office lady in her twenties who lives with Rilakkuma, Korilakkuma and Kiiroitori.

A delivery man who is Tokio's cousin and Kaoru's love interest.

A lonely boy who lives in Kaoru's apartment complex.

One of Kaoru's colleagues.

Production
An initial pitch was made by Tokyo representatives at Netflix in 2016. The series was announced publicly in 2017 and was originally slated for a 2018 release.

Director Masahito Kobayashi drew inspiration from Wes Anderson's films, such as Fantastic Mr. Fox and Isle of Dogs. Kaoru, who had appeared as a silhouette in the original Rilakkuma comic series, was given a physical presence and her experiences were drawn from the female staff members. The fictional city that the show takes place in, Ogigaya, is a mash-up of the Ogikubo and Asagaya neighborhoods in Tokyo. The series was made at Dwarf Studio, who previously made stop motion Domo-kun animation. 10 separate stages were set up, with the staff filming about 10 seconds of footage per day simultaneously.

In 2018, Netflix announced the show would be released on April 19, 2019, and star Mikako Tabe as Kaoru. Original characters created for the series, Tokio, Hayate, and Sayu, were introduced in March 2019. Aside from playing Hayate, Takayuki Yamada also played an assortment of minor roles in the series, including the shaved ice stand man in episode 4, the man in the Yuriko horror movie, Kaoru's landlord, Kaoru's boss, the fisherman in episode 8, the photographer in episode 10, and the alien in episode 11.

Episodes

Season 1 (2019)

Season 2 (2022)

Reception
Petrana Radulovic from Polygon called the show endearing and complimented the juxtaposition of the "whimsy" with Kaoru's struggles with her adult life. James Whitbrook from io9 described the show as "a love letter to the need to escape", noting its message that sometimes even small acts of escape from everyday life are necessary. Anime News Network praised the animation and concept, but mentioned that there was little exploration and resolution towards Kaoru's troubles.

References

External links
 
 
 

2019 anime ONAs
Animated television series about bears
Japanese-language Netflix original programming
Netflix original anime
Slice of life anime and manga
Stop-motion animated television series
Workplace comedy television series